Duble Sidekick is a South Korean music producer and songwriting duo consisting of lyricist Park Jang-geun and composer Mikey (also known as Chancellor and formerly a member of One Way). The duo was formed in 2010, and rose to fame after producing MBLAQ's 2012 EP 100% Ver. Since then, they have produced many hit songs. In late 2012, they expanded their team to include more composers and started their own entertainment agency called Duble Kick Entertainment. Wellmade Yedang became the agency's largest shareholder in May 2014.

Production discography

Awards and nominations

Melon Music Awards

|-
| 2012
| Duble Sidekick (Sistar's "Loving U", Baek Ji-young's "Voice", "Good Boy")
| Songwriter Award
|

Gaon Chart K-Pop Awards

|-
| 2013
| Duble Sidekick
| Composer of the Year
|

See also
 Shinsadong Tiger
 Brave Brothers

References

External links
 

South Korean record producers
South Korean male songwriters
Melon Music Award winners